Operation Tupac is the codename of an ongoing military-intelligence contingency program that has been active since the 1980s and run by  Pakistan's main intelligence agency Inter-Services Intelligence (ISI). It has a three-part action plan to provide covert support to anti-India separatists and militants in Indian-administered Kashmir. The program was authorized and initiated in 1988 by the order of the then-President of Pakistan, Muhammad Zia-ul-Haq.

The codename of the program is derived from the name of Túpac Amaru II, an 18th-century Peruvian revolutionary who led a large Andean uprising against Spanish colonial rule in Peru. The program is thought to be actively ongoing as the ISI has maintained its support for Kashmiri separatists, Islamists and other ideological militants in their fight against the Indian administration in Jammu and Kashmir.

While all Kashmiri separatist groups received funding and support, organizations that espoused an explicit pro-Pakistan stance in the Kashmir conflict were more heavily favoured by the Pakistani state. Under this program, the ISI helped create six separatist militant groups in Indian-administered Kashmir, including Lashkar-e-Taiba, which notoriously perpetrated the 2008 Mumbai attacks in India. American intelligence officials have speculated that the ISI has continued to provide protection, support and intelligence to Lashkar-e-Taiba, among other militant groups in the region.

ISI role
The Inter-Services Intelligence (ISI), intelligence agency of Pakistan has been involved in running military intelligence programs in India, with one of the subsections of its Joint Intelligence Bureau (JIB) department devoted to perform various operations in India. The Joint Signal Intelligence Bureau (JSIB) department has also been involved in providing communications support to Pakistani agents operating in regions of the Union Territory of Jammu and Kashmir of India. The Joint Intelligence North section of the Joint Counter-Intelligence Bureau (JCIB) wing deals particularly with India. In the 1950s the ISI's Covert Action Division was alleged for supplied arms to insurgents in Northeast India.

The Pakistani Inter-Services Intelligence has encouraged and aided the Kashmir independence movement through an insurgency due to its dispute on the legitimacy of Indian rule in Kashmir, with the insurgency as an easy way to keep Indian troops distracted and cause international condemnation of India.

Former Pakistan President General Pervez Musharraf in Oct 2014 said during TV interview, "We have source (in Kashmir) besides the (Pakistan) army...People in Kashmir are fighting against (India). We just need to incite them."

The Federal Bureau of Investigation (FBI), in their first ever open acknowledgement in 2011 in US Court, said that the Inter-Services Intelligence (ISI) sponsors terrorism in Kashmir and it oversees terrorist separatist groups in Kashmir.

In 2019, Prime Minister of Pakistan Imran Khan publicly discouraged Pakistani people from going to Kashmir to do a jihad. People who went to Kashmir will do an "injustice to the Kashmiri people". Most of the Pakistani militants who had crossed the border over the years and were caught by the Indian security forces were found to belong to the Punjab province of Pakistan.

India has also accused the ISI of reinvigorating separatism and insurgencies in the country via support to pro-Khalistan militant groups such as the International Sikh Youth Federation (ISYF), in order to destabilize India. A report by India's Intelligence Bureau (IB) indicated that ISI was "desperately trying to revive Sikh" militant activity in India. The ISI is also allegedly active in printing and supplying counterfeit Indian rupee notes.

Scope and objectives of the program

The primary objectives of Pakistan's Operation Tupac upon its execution were:

to provide arms support and finance to separatists, militants and Islamists in India.
to trigger a Balkanization of India.
to utilize the spy network to act as an instrument of sabotage.
to exploit porous borders with Nepal and Bangladesh, Myanmar to set up bases and train anti-india militants for conduct operations against india.
to install sleeper cells in india and its neighbour countries.

Operation Tupac & Insurgency in Jammu & Kashmir
After the Mujahideen victory against the Soviet Union occupation in Afghanistan, Mujahideen fighters, under the Operation Tupac with the aid of Pakistan, slowly infiltrated Kashmir with the goal of spreading a Radical Islamist ideology to Jihad against indian occupation in Jammu and Kashmir.

See also
Inter-Services Intelligence activities in India, an overview of the covert activities of Pakistan's ISI within India
Pakistan and state-sponsored terrorism, an overview of Pakistan's involvement with and exploitation of militant groups
Bleed India with a Thousand Cuts, a doctrine of the Pakistani military
Insurgency in Jammu and Kashmir, an ongoing militant uprising in Indian-administered Kashmir against Indian rule

References

Tupac
Inter-Services Intelligence operations
Cold War conflicts
Kashmir conflict
India–Pakistan relations